Priisle is a subdistrict in the district of Lasnamäe, Tallinn, the capital of Estonia. It has a population of 10,949.

Iru hill fort
On a hill by Pirita River in Iru, the remains of an  ancient hill fort are located. The settlement has a history dating back to the third millennium BC. It seems to have been continuously occupied, and strengthened into a more fortress-like castle in the 5th century AD. It remained in use until the 11th century. Archaeological investigations have shown that the settlement was burnt several times. Some of the oldest remains of buildings in Estonia, as well as some of the oldest items made of iron, have been found during excavations.

References

External links 

Subdistricts of Tallinn